Didier Hassoux is a French investigative journalist and political writer. He is the co-author of six books about French politics, and he writes for Le Canard enchaîné.

During the 2017 French presidential election, center-right candidate François Fillon said his sixth book, Bienvenue Place Beauvau, suggested President François Hollande ran a shadow cabinet to spread rumours about his opponents. Hassoux denied this was the case.

Works

References

Living people
French male journalists
20th-century French journalists
21st-century French journalists
French investigative journalists
Year of birth missing (living people)